Scientists against Nuclear Arms (SANA) was formed in 1981 by the physicist and peace activist Mike Pentz together with Steven Rose, both academics at the Open University, to oppose nuclear arms.

SANA was one of the forerunner organisations of Scientists for Global Responsibility (SGR).

See also
Campaign for Nuclear Disarmament
Anti-nuclear movement
Anti-war
European Nuclear Disarmament
Independent Nuclear Disarmament Election Committee
International Coalition to Ban Uranium Weapons
Nuclear disarmament
Nuclear-Free Future Award
Nuclear Information Service
Nuclear proliferation
Peace movement

References

Organizations established in 1981
Organizations with year of disestablishment missing
1981 establishments in England
Defunct organisations based in England
Anti–nuclear weapons movement
Anti-nuclear organizations
History of science and technology in England
Ethics of science and technology
Open University